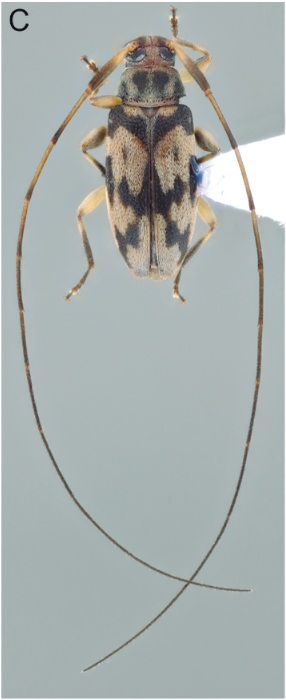

Scientific classification
- Kingdom: Animalia
- Phylum: Arthropoda
- Clade: Pancrustacea
- Class: Insecta
- Order: Coleoptera
- Suborder: Polyphaga
- Infraorder: Cucujiformia
- Family: Cerambycidae
- Genus: Polymitoleiopus
- Species: P. nutrix

Binomial name
- Polymitoleiopus nutrix (Nascimento, Santos-Silva & Flechtmann, 2021)

Synonyms
- Urgleptes nutrix Nascimento, Santos-Silva & Flechtmann, 2021

= Polymitoleiopus nutrix =

Species of beetle

Polymitoleiopus nutrix is a species of beetle of the family Cerambycidae. It is found in Brazil (Mato Grosso do Sul, São Paulo).
